Supriyo Chakraborty (born 9 May 1995) is an Indian cricketer. He made his Twenty20 debut for Jharkhand in the 2018–19 Syed Mushtaq Ali Trophy on 8 March 2019.

References

External links
 

1995 births
Living people
Indian cricketers
Jharkhand cricketers
Place of birth missing (living people)